The 1998 United States House of Representatives elections in Texas occurred on November 3, 1998, to elect the members of the state of Texas's delegation to the United States House of Representatives. Texas had thirty seats in the House, apportioned according to the 1990 United States Census.

These elections occurred simultaneously with the United States Senate elections of 1998, the United States House elections in other states, and various state and local elections.

Overview

Congressional Districts

District 1 
Incumbent Democrat Max Sandlin ran for re-election.

District 2 
Incumbent Democrat Jim Turner ran for re-election.

District 3 
Incumbent Republican Sam Johnson ran for re-election.

District 4 
Incumbent Democrat Ralph Hall ran for re-election.

District 5 
Incumbent Republican Pete Sessions ran for re-election.

District 6 
Incumbent Republican Joe Barton ran for re-election.

District 7 
Incumbent Republican Bill Archer ran for re-election.

District 8 
Incumbent Republican Kevin Brady ran for re-election.

District 9 
Incumbent Democrat Nick Lampson ran for re-election.

District 10 
Incumbent Democrat Lloyd Doggett ran for re-election.

District 11 
Incumbent Democrat Chet Edwards ran for re-election.

District 12 
Incumbent Republican Kay Granger ran for re-election.

District 13 
Incumbent Republican Mac Thornberry ran for re-election.

District 14 
Incumbent Republican Ron Paul ran for re-election.

District 15 
Incumbent Democrat Ruben Hinojosa ran for re-election.

District 16 
Incumbent Democrat Silvestre Reyes ran for re-election.

District 17 
Incumbent Democrat Charles Stenholm ran for re-election.

District 18 
Incumbent Democrat Sheila Jackson Lee ran for re-election.

District 19 
Incumbent Republican Larry Combest ran for re-election.

District 20 
Incumbent Democrat Henry B. González opted to retire rather than run for re-election. He initially planned to retire prior to the end of his term, which would have led to the calling of a special election, but he ended up serving the entire remainder of his term. His son Charlie ran for the open seat.

District 21 
Incumbent Republican Lamar Smith ran for re-election.

District 22 
Incumbent Republican Tom DeLay ran for re-election.

District 23 
Incumbent Republican Henry Bonilla ran for re-election.

District 24 
Incumbent Democrat Martin Frost ran for re-election.

District 25 
Incumbent Democrat Ken Bentsen ran for re-election.

District 26 
Incumbent Republican Dick Armey ran for re-election.

District 27 
Incumbent Democrat Solomon Ortiz ran for re-election.

District 28 
Incumbent Democrat Frank Tejeda died on January 30, 1997, from pneumonia while being treated for a brain tumor. This prompted a special election to be held, which fellow Democrat Ciro Rodriguez won in a runoff. He ran for re-election.

District 29 
Incumbent Democrat Gene Green ran for re-election.

District 30 
Incumbent Democrat Eddie Bernice Johnson ran for re-election.

References

Texas
1998
United States House of Representatives